Bourron-Marlotte is a commune in the Seine-et-Marne department in the Île-de-France region in north-central France. In the second half of the 19th century, it was visited by several impressionist painters including Alfred Sisley, Pierre-Auguste Renoir and Paul Cézanne. Bourron-Marlotte – Grez station has rail connections to Montargis, Melun and Paris. The inhabitants are called Bourronnais-Marlottins.

Famous Residents

The following people have lived in Bourron-Marlotte
Paul Cézanne (1839–1906), painter, artist

See also
Château de Bourron
Communes of the Seine-et-Marne department

References

External links

1999 Land Use, from IAURIF (Institute for Urban Planning and Development of the Paris-Île-de-France région) 
 

Communes of Seine-et-Marne